The softmax function, also known as softargmax or normalized exponential function, converts a vector of  real numbers into a probability distribution of  possible outcomes. It is a generalization of the logistic function to multiple dimensions, and used in multinomial logistic regression. The softmax function is often used as the last activation function of a neural network to normalize the output of a network to a probability distribution over predicted output classes, based on Luce's choice axiom.

Definition 

The softmax function takes as input a vector  of  real numbers, and normalizes it into a probability distribution consisting of  probabilities proportional to the exponentials of the input numbers. That is, prior to applying softmax, some vector components could be negative, or greater than one; and might not sum to 1; but after applying softmax, each component will be in the interval , and the components will add up to 1, so that they can be interpreted as probabilities. Furthermore, the larger input components will correspond to larger probabilities. 

The standard (unit) softmax function is defined when  by the formula

In simple words, it applies the standard exponential function to each element  of the input vector  and normalizes these values by dividing by the sum of all these exponentials; this normalization ensures that the sum of the components of the output vector  is 1. The term "softmax" derives from the amplifying effects of the exponential on any maxima in the input vector.

In general, instead of  a different base  can be used. If , smaller input components will result in larger output probabilities, and decreasing the value of  will create probability distributions that are more concentrated around the positions of the smallest input values. Conversely, as above, if  larger input components will result in larger output probabilities, and increasing the value of  will create probability distributions that are more concentrated around the positions of the largest input values.

In some fields, the base is fixed, corresponding to a fixed scale, while in others the parameter  is varied.

Interpretations

Smooth arg max 

The name "softmax" is misleading; the function is not a smooth maximum (a smooth approximation to the maximum function), but is rather a smooth approximation to the arg max function: the function whose value is which index has the maximum. In fact, the term "softmax" is also used for the closely related LogSumExp function, which is a smooth maximum. For this reason, some prefer the more accurate term "softargmax", but the term "softmax" is conventional in machine learning. This section uses the term "softargmax" to emphasize this interpretation.

Formally, instead of considering the arg max as a function with categorical output  (corresponding to the index), consider the arg max function with one-hot representation of the output (assuming there is a unique maximum arg):

For example, in this encoding  since the third argument is the maximum.

This can be generalized to multiple arg max values (multiple equal  being the maximum) by dividing the 1 between all max args; formally  where  is the number of arguments assuming the maximum. For example,  since the second and third argument are both the maximum. In case all arguments are equal, this is simply  Points  with multiple arg max values are singular points (or singularities, and form the singular set) – these are the points where arg max is discontinuous (with a jump discontinuity) – while points with a single arg max are known as non-singular or regular points.

In fact, softargmax is continuous, but arg max is not continuous at the singular set where two coordinates are equal, while the uniform limit of continuous functions is continuous. The reason it fails to converge uniformly is that for inputs where two coordinates are almost equal (and one is the maximum), the arg max is the index of one or the other, so a small change in input yields a large change in output. However, softargmax does converge compactly on the non-singular set.

In the language of tropical analysis, the softmax is a deformation or "quantization" of arg max and arg min, corresponding to using the log semiring instead of the max-plus semiring (respectively min-plus semiring), and recovering the arg max or arg min by taking the limit is called "tropicalization" or "dequantization".

It is also the case that, for any fixed , if one input  is much larger than the others relative to the temperature, the output is approximately the arg max. For example, a difference of 10 is large relative to a temperature of 1:

However, if the difference is small relative to the temperature, the value is not close to the arg max. For example, a difference of 10 is small relative to a temperature of 100:

As , temperature goes to zero, so eventually all differences become large (relative to a shrinking temperature), which gives another interpretation for the limit behavior.

Probability theory 
In probability theory, the output of the softargmax function can be used to represent a categorical distribution – that is, a probability distribution over  different possible outcomes.

Statistical mechanics 

Applications 
The softmax function is used in various multiclass classification methods, such as multinomial logistic regression (also known as softmax regression) , multiclass linear discriminant analysis, naive Bayes classifiers, and artificial neural networks. Specifically, in multinomial logistic regression and linear discriminant analysis, the input to the function is the result of  distinct linear functions, and the predicted probability for the th class given a sample vector  and a weighting vector  is:

Neural networks 
The standard softmax function is often used in the final layer of a neural network-based classifier. Such networks are commonly trained under a log loss (or cross-entropy) regime, giving a non-linear variant of multinomial logistic regression.

Since the function maps a vector and a specific index  to a real value, the derivative needs to take the index into account:

This expression is symmetrical in the indexes  and thus may also be expressed as

Here, the Kronecker delta is used for simplicity (cf. the derivative of a sigmoid function, being expressed via the function itself). 

In order to achieve stable numerical computations of the derivative, one often subtracts a constant from the input vector. In theory, this does not change the output, and neither the derivative. But it is more stable as it can control explicitly the largest value computed in each exponent. 

See multinomial logit for a probability model which uses the softmax activation function.

Reinforcement learning 
In the field of reinforcement learning, a softmax function can be used to convert values into action probabilities. The function commonly used is:

For high temperatures, all actions have nearly the same probability and the lower the temperature, the more expected rewards affect the probability. For a low temperature, the probability of the action with the highest expected reward tends to 1.

Computational complexity and remedies 
In neural network applications, the number  of possible outcomes is often large, e.g. in case of neural language models that predict the most likely outcome out of a vocabulary which might contain millions of possible words. What's more, the gradient descent backpropagation method for training such a neural network involves calculating the softmax for every training example, and the number of training examples can also become large. The computational effort for the softmax became a major limiting factor in the development of larger neural language models, motivating various remedies to reduce training times.

Approaches that reorganize the softmax layer for more efficient calculation include the hierarchical softmax and the differentiated softmax. The hierarchical softmax (introduced by Morin and Bengio in 2005) uses a binary tree structure where the outcomes (vocabulary words) are the leaves and the intermediate nodes are suitably selected "classes" of outcomes, forming latent variables. The desired probability (softmax value) of a leaf (outcome) can then be calculated as the product of the probabilities of all nodes on the path from the root to that leaf. In practice, results depend on choosing a good strategy for clustering the outcomes into classes. A Huffman tree was used for this in Google's word2vec models (introduced in 2013) to achieve scalability.

A second kind of remedies is based on approximating the softmax (during training) with modified loss functions that avoid the calculation of the full normalization factor. These include methods that restrict the normalization sum to a sample of outcomes (e.g. Importance Sampling, Target Sampling).

Mathematical properties 
Geometrically the softmax function maps the vector space  to the boundary of the standard -simplex, cutting the dimension by one (the range is a -dimensional simplex in -dimensional space), due to the linear constraint that all output sum to 1 meaning it lies on a hyperplane.

Along the main diagonal  softmax is just the uniform distribution on outputs, : equal scores yield equal probabilities.

More generally, softmax is invariant under translation by the same value in each coordinate: adding  to the inputs  yields , because it multiplies each exponent by the same factor,  (because ), so the ratios do not change:

 

Geometrically, softmax is constant along diagonals: this is the dimension that is eliminated, and corresponds to the softmax output being independent of a translation in the input scores (a choice of 0 score). One can normalize input scores by assuming that the sum is zero (subtract the average:  where ), and then the softmax takes the hyperplane of points that sum to zero, to the open simplex of positive values that sum to 1, analogously to how the exponent takes 0 to 1,  and is positive.

By contrast, softmax is not invariant under scaling. For instance,  but 

The standard logistic function is the special case for a 1-dimensional axis in 2-dimensional space, say the x-axis in the  plane. One variable is fixed at 0 (say ), so , and the other variable can vary, denote it , so  the standard logistic function, and  its complement (meaning they add up to 1). The 1-dimensional input could alternatively be expressed as the line , with outputs  and 

The softmax function is also the gradient of the LogSumExp function, a smooth maximum:

 

History 
The softmax function was used in statistical mechanics as the Boltzmann distribution in the foundational paper , formalized and popularized in the influential textbook .

In machine learning, the term "softmax" is credited to John S. Bridle in two 1989 conference papers, : and :

Example 
The output has most of its weight where the "4" was in the original input. This is what the function is normally used for: to highlight the largest values and suppress values which are significantly below the maximum value. This shows that for values between 0 and 1 softmax, in fact, de-emphasizes the maximum value (note that 0.169 is not only less than 0.475, it is also less than the initial proportion of ).

Computation of this example using Python code:

>>> import numpy as np
>>> a = [1.0, 2.0, 3.0, 4.0, 1.0, 2.0, 3.0]
>>> np.exp(a) / np.sum(np.exp(a)) 
array([0.02364054, 0.06426166, 0.1746813, 0.474833, 0.02364054,
       0.06426166, 0.1746813])

Here is an example of Julia code:

julia> A = [1.0, 2.0, 3.0, 4.0, 1.0, 2.0, 3.0];  # semicolon to suppress interactive output

julia> exp.(A) ./ sum(exp, A)
7-element Array{Float64,1}:
 0.0236405
 0.0642617
 0.174681
 0.474833
 0.0236405
 0.0642617
 0.174681

Here is an example of R code:

> z <- c(1.0, 2.0, 3.0, 4.0, 1.0, 2.0, 3.0)
> softmax <- exp(z)/sum(exp(z))
> softmax
[1] 0.02364054 0.06426166 0.17468130 0.47483300 0.02364054 0.06426166 0.17468130

Here is an example of Elixir code:
iex> t = Nx.tensor([[1, 2], [3, 4]])
iex> Nx.divide(Nx.exp(t), Nx.sum(Nx.exp(t)))

#Nx.Tensor<
  f64[2][2]
  [
    [0.03205860328008499, 0.08714431874203257],
    [0.23688281808991013, 0.6439142598879722]
  ]
>

Here is an example of Raku code:

> my @z = [1.0, 2.0, 3.0, 4.0, 1.0, 2.0, 3.0];
> say @z.map: {exp($_)/sum(@z.map: {exp($_)})}

(0.023640543021591385 0.06426165851049616 0.17468129859572226 0.4748329997443803 0.023640543021591385 0.06426165851049616 0.17468129859572226)

See also 
 Softplus
 Multinomial logistic regression
 Dirichlet distribution – an alternative way to sample categorical distributions
 Partition function
 Exponential tilting - a generalization of Softmax to more general probability distributions.

Notes

References 

Computational neuroscience
Logistic regression
Artificial neural networks
Functions and mappings
Articles with example Python (programming language) code
Exponentials
Articles with example Julia code
Articles with example R code